Black Africa, White Marble is a 2012 Italian documentary about Congo-Brazzaville made by Clement Bicocchi.

The documentary is framed around the plans of Sassou Nguesso to transfer the remains of Pierre Savorgnan de Brazza from his grave in Algiers to a $9 million mausoleum in Brazzaville. The documentary follows a visit to Congo by one of Brazza's descendants, the Italian writer Idanna Pucci. Pucci, a niece of Emilio Pucci, highlights the fact that Nguesso's memorial plans do not benefit the people of Congo. Worse, they diminish the status of the current King Makoko, spiritual leader of the Bateke, whose ancestor had signed the pact with Brazza in 1880. In Pucci's words:

The film was shown at the African Film Festival, Inc. in 2012 and 2013. It won the Silver Punt Audience Award for best documentary at the 33rd Cambridge Film Festival. It was also shown at Lights, Camera Africa! 2015.

References

External links
 
 Camera Q&A: Clemente Bicocchi on Brazza and the Congo, camerainthesun.com

2012 films
Italian documentary films
Films set in the Republic of the Congo
Works about the Republic of the Congo
2012 documentary films